The 1927 Colorado Silver and Gold football team was an American football team that represented the University of Colorado as a member of the Rocky Mountain Conference (RMC) during the 1927 college football season. Led by eighth-year head coach Myron E. Witham, Colorado compiled an overall record of 4–5  with a mark of 4–4 in conference play, tying for sixth place in the RMC.

Schedule

References

Colorado
Colorado Buffaloes football seasons
Colorado Silver and Gold football